Altamira Software was founded in Mill Valley, California by Dr. Alvy Ray Smith, Eric Lyons and Nicholas Clay in 1991.

The company's primary product was Altamira Composer. This PC based software pioneered object-based drawing and image editing. Composer was one of the first to bring important tools such as anti-aliased effects and image sprites to the desktop. The company was acquired by Microsoft in 1994. Thea Grigsby was Vice President of Marketing. David Shantz of WildOutWest, LLC (www.wildoutwest.com) was responsible for branding, package design and the development of a series of image object libraries that were released along with the product.

Seed capital came from Autodesk and second-round financing from a team of venture capitalists (TVI) and private individuals. Altamira's Windows product,  Altamira Composer, one of the first image composition applications with image sprites (i.e., non-rectangular, floating images), entered the market in November 1993 (CoSA After Effects 1.0 shipped in January of that same year).

References 

Defunct software companies of the United States
Microsoft acquisitions
Software companies based in the San Francisco Bay Area
Companies based in Marin County, California
Software companies established in 1991
Software companies disestablished in 1994
1991 establishments in California
1994 disestablishments in California
1994 mergers and acquisitions
Defunct companies based in the San Francisco Bay Area